Shillingstone  is a village and civil parish in the Blackmore Vale area of north Dorset, England, situated on the River Stour between Sturminster Newton and Blandford Forum. In the 2011 Census the civil parish had 479 households and a population of 1,170.

South of Shillingstone is a large area of woodland on Okeford and Shillingstone Hill which forms part of Blandford Forest.

History
Shillingstone features in the Domesday Book of 1086 as a settlement of 46 households, with meadow, woodlands and a mill, under the lordship of Ascelin. Its name is a derivation of Eschelling's (or Ascelin's) town. An agricultural community, it specialised in the production of moss.

In the first World War, it earned the title, "the bravest village in Britain", because of the high proportion of residents who volunteered to join the armed forces. In 1924 the Shillingstone lime works was started to extract lime from the chalk beds at Shillingstone Hill.

Shillingstone Parish Council meets monthly to discuss planning applications, maintenance of allotments and the local recreation ground, and other local amenities.

Parish church
The parish Church of the Holy Rood is a short distance away from the village and is of 12th-century origin, constructed in banded flint and ashlar masonry. It was enlarged in the 15th century and in the 19th century; G. F. Bodley added the north aisle. The font is of the 12th century and the pulpit of the 17th. The hymn writer Edward Dayman was appointed Rector of Shillingstone in 1842. About 165 yards [150m] south of the church is a Medieval cross base.

Railway station
Shillingstone railway station still survives intact on the former line of the Somerset and Dorset Joint Railway, now part of the North Dorset Trailway. The station is one of the best-preserved on the Somerset and Dorset line since the railway's closure in 1966. It opened on Monday 31 August 1863 and closed just over a century later on Sunday 6 March 1966. The station is undergoing extensive restoration by the Shillingstone Station Project, supported by the North Dorset Railway Trust. The village also had a light railway serving Shillingstone House, the post-war home of Sir Thomas Salt.

Education
The village has a primary school, affiliated to the Church of England and is also home to independent special school, The Forum School.
Until around 1997, Shillingstone was the location of the now-defunct girls' boarding school, Croft House School. The independent Hanford School is also near the village.

Governance
Shillingstone is the most populous area of Bulbarrow electoral ward, which extends south to Winterbourne Strickland and had a population of 1,850 in the 2011 census. Bulbarrow forms part of the constituency of North Dorset, which is currently represented in the UK parliament by the Conservative Simon Hoare.

References

External links

 Shillingstone Station Project

Villages in Dorset